John Foxcraft (16 October 1806 – 26 January 1853) was an English first-class cricketer active 1837–42 who played for Nottingham Cricket Club (aka Nottinghamshire). He was born and died in Nottingham. He appeared in four first-class matches.

Notes

Bibliography
 

1806 births
1853 deaths
English cricketers
Nottinghamshire cricketers
Gentlemen of Nottinghamshire cricketers